Mookilla Rajyathu is a 1991 Indian Malayalam-language slapstick comedy film directed by the Ashokan-Thaha duo and written by B. Jayachandran. It stars Mukesh, Thilakan, Jagathy Sreekumar, Siddique, and Vinaya Prasad. The film features music composed by Ouseppachan. The plot revolves around four patients escaped from a mental asylum and the troubles they cause in their attempts to start a new life in a sane society. Thilakan's performance was widely appreciated in the movie and it is considered one of his career best performances in a comical role. The movie is widely regarded as a classic of the golden age of Malayalam comedy (the comedy era started around 1983-1985 and went into decline in the late 1990s).

Plot

The film starts by displaying an antic of Keshavan (Thilakan) who is an inmate of the Kakkanad Mental Hospital. Two other inmates are Benny (Mukesh) and Krishnankutty (Jagathy Sreekumar). By profession Benny is an artist, Krishnankutty is an auto-mechanic and Keshavan has retired from military service. The trio chance to come across a newspaper report that the Bollywood film star Amitabh Bachchan is visiting Ernakulam city for a film shooting, which is close to where they stay. They are soon joined by a new inmate Venu (Siddique), who takes him to the mental hospital. Venu is a good singer but suffers from a compulsive obsession to singing. All the four share a passion for Amitabh Bachchan.

Driven by a desire to see Amitabh Bachchan the four manage to escape from the mental hospital that night by outsmarting the cell warden Ameen (Mala Aravindan). They reach Ernakulam city in a bus but are disappointed to learn that Amitabh Bachchan had gone back after the film shooting which was a month ago and that they had in fact seen an old newspaper report. When they wake up the next morning, they find Venu missing. They go searching for him alone. Benny meets his former college mate and lover Leena (Vinaya Prasad) in the city. Keshavan goes to a politician's rally and undresses in support of the Swadeshi movement, only to be saved by Benny. Krishnankutty drinks at a bar, but finds that he does not have money to pay for it, and is assaulted. Finally, they find Venu having found employment as a singer, and he is chased by Balan, his older brother and Ameen. They decide to live by finding suitable employments. They find shelter in a rented house owned by a young dance teacher (Suchitra), whom Leena mistakes as Benny's new lover. Benny becomes a painter, Krishnankutty a mechanic, and Keshavan a security guard. Leena's father is unwilling to give his daughter in marriage to Benny because of his insanity, and even unsuccessfully hires a goonda Bheem Singh (Krishnankutty Nair) to assault him.

Two conmen Vasu (Kuthiravattam Pappu) and Abdullah (Rajan P. Dev) who use the pseudonyms Sundaran Pillai and Gireesh Puri, are in the disguise of a TV serial producer and director, respectively. Their intention is to rob a bank near the house rented by the four by making a tunnel through their house while they are busy. They hire the four under the pretext of their TV serial and send them to learn various skills like martial arts, rock climbing, tree climbing and break dance among other things. They manage to keep them away from the house during daytime while the excavation is going on under the supervision of another gang member Bruno (Kunchan).

However, a police officer (Jagadish) is tracking their activities. In the end, their vicious scheme is busted up by the police officer, assisted by the four who wake up to the reality. The bank robbers end up in police custody.

Cast

Music 

The soundtrack was composed by Ouseppachan. It features three songs which were sung by M. G. Sreekumar and K. S. Chithra. The lyrics were written by Kaithapram Damodaran and Poovachal Khader.

References

External links
 

1990s Malayalam-language films
1991 films
Films scored by Ouseppachan
Indian comedy films
Films about psychiatry
Films shot in Kochi
Malayalam films remade in other languages